Capece is an Italian surname. Notable people with the surname include:

Bill Capece (born 1959), American football player
Corrado Capece (died 1482), Italian Roman Catholic prelate, Archbishop of Benevento
Carlo Sigismondo Capece (1652–1728), Italian dramatist and librettist
Federico Capece (born 1976), Argentine footballer
Giorgio Capece (born 1992), Italian footballer
Giuseppe Capece Zurlo (1711–1801), Italian cardinal
Irma Capece Minutolo (born 1935), Italian opera singer
Ottaviano Capece (died 1616), Italian Roman Catholic prelate, Bishop of Nicotera

Italian-language surnames